Bhatkal Assembly constituency is one of the 224 Legislative Assembly constituencies of Karnataka state in India.

It is part of Uttara Kannada district.

Members of the Legislative Assembly 
Source:

Election results

2018

See also
 List of constituencies of the Karnataka Legislative Assembly
 Uttara Kannada district

References

Uttara Kannada district
Assembly constituencies of Karnataka